Levison is a surname. Notable people with the surname include:

  Alan Wendell Levison, birth name of Alan Wendell Livingston (1917–2009), American music executive
 Catherine Levison, American writer and public speaker
 David Levison (1919–2012), Scottish minister
 Ejnar Levison (1880–1970), Danish fencer
 Harold F. Levison (born 1959), planetary scientist
 Iain Levison (born 1963), Scottish-American writer
 Jay Livingston (born Jacob Harold Levison, 1915–2001), songwriter
 Levison Wood (born 1982), British Army officer and explorer
 Mary Levison, (1923–2011), Church of Scotland minister
 Nat Levison, British actor
 Sarah Rachel Russell (1814–1880), British con artist who went by Levison 
 Stanley Levison (1912–1979), American businessman
 Wilhelm Levison (1876–1947), German medievalist

See also 
 Leveson
 Lewisohn
 Levinson

Jewish surnames
Levite surnames
Yiddish-language surnames
Patronymic surnames